The National Biography Award, established in Australia in 1996, is awarded for the best published work of biographical or autobiographical writing by an Australian. It aims "to encourage the highest standards of writing biography and autobiography and to promote public interest in those genres". It was initially awarded every two years, but from 2002 it has been awarded annually. Its administration was taken over by the State Library of New South Wales in 1998.

History of the Award 
It was originally endowed by private benefactor, Dr. Geoffrey Cains, and the original prize money was $12,500. In 2002, Cains said of endowing the award that "I wanted to give back to literature something, it had given me so much; besides, philanthropy in this country is so overlooked and diminished". In 2005, the prize money was increased to $20,000 with the support of Michael Crouch. Belinda Hutchinson, former President of the Library Council of NSW, expressed gratitude for this increase to "an award that celebrates the Australian psyche through distinguished biography writing."

In 2012 the prize money for the Award has been increased to $25,000. Since 2013, each shortlisted author receives $1,000. The judging panel varies from year to year. In 2018 the Michael Crouch Award was introduced for an Australian writer's first published biography.

The shortlist is announced in early July each year, followed by the winner announcement in early August.

Winners 
2022: Bernadette Brennan for Leaping into Waterfalls: The Enigmatic Gillian Mears
2021: Cassandra Pybus for Truganini: Journey Through the Apocalypse
2020: Patrick Mullins for Tiberius with a Telephone: The Life and Stories of William McMahon
2019: Behrouz Boochani for No Friend But the Mountains: Writing from Manus Prison
2018: Judith Brett for The Enigmatic Mr Deakin
2017: Tom D C Roberts for Before Rupert: Keith Murdoch and the Birth of a Dynasty
2016: Brenda Niall for Mannix
2015: Philip Butterss for An Unsentimental Bloke: The Life and Work of C J Dennis  
2014: Alison Alexander for The Ambitions of Jane Franklin: Victorian Lady Adventurer
2013: Peter Fitzpatrick for The Two Frank Thrings
2012: Martin Thomas for The Many Worlds of R. H. Mathews: In Search of an Australian Anthropologist
2011: Alasdair McGregor for Grand Obsessions: The Life and Work of Walter Burley Griffin and Marion Mahony Griffin
2010: Brian Matthews for Manning Clark: A Life
2009: Ann Blainey for I am Melba
2008: Joint winners
Philip Dwyer for Napoleon, 1769-1799: The Path to Power
Graham Seal for These Few Lines: A Convict Story – The Lost Lives of Myra and William Sykes
2007: Jacob Rosenberg for East of Time
2006: John Hughes for The Idea of Home
2005: Robert Hillman for The Boy in the Green Suit
2004: Barry Hill for Broken Song: T.G.H. Strehlow and Aboriginal Possession
2003: Joint winners
Peter Rose for Rose Boys
Don Watson for Recollections of a Bleeding Heart : a Portrait of Paul Keating PM
2002: Jacqueline Kent for A Certain Style: Beatrice Davis, a Literary Life
2000: Joint winners
Peter Robb for M, a biography of European painter Caravaggio
Mandy Sayer for Dreamtime Alice: a Memoir
1998: Roberta Sykes for Snake Cradle
1996: Abraham Biderman for The World of My Past

National Biography Award Lecture

In 2003, the National Biography Award lecture was instituted. It is associated with the award, and was also sponsored by Cains and Crouch. It is given annually, but takes place during the same week as the announcement of the winner.
2018: Unauthorised, by Tom D C Roberts
2017: A tale finds its teller: writing the biography of Thea Astley, by Karen Lamb
2016: For better or worse: The relationship between biographer and subject, by Philip Butterss
2015: Biography and me: notes on the wonders of others (and some on self), by Kim Williams AM
2014: Based on a true story, by Linda Jaivin
2013: A different perspective, a shared story, by John Elder Robison
2012: Looking for Eliza by Evelyn Juers
2011: Recollections of a Bleeding Heart: A Portrait of Paul Keating PM, by Don Watson
2010: Biography: The Art of the Impossible, by Hilary McPhee AO
2009: ‘Truth’ as applied to biography and autobiography, by Raimond Gaita
2008: Biography, Autobiography and Memoir: Presidential Bests and Worsts, by Bob Carr
2007: Biography: The Impossible Art, by Inga Clendinnen
2006: Materials for Life: The Enduring Value of Biography, by Robyn Archer
2005: Personal Drama: David Williamson on Self-depiction, by David Williamson
2004: The Observed of all Observers: Biography in Poetry, by Peter Porter (poet)
2003: Goethe's Two Left Feet: Reflections on the Hazards and Liberties of Biography, by Peter Rose (writer)

References

External links
Bennie, Angela (2005) "Award draws people with a tale to tell" in The Sydney Morning Herald, 23 February 2005
Bennie, Angela (2002) "They're six of the best" in The Sydney Morning Herald, 1 March 2002
"Inga Clendinnen on the impossibility of biography" (lecture), on ABC Radio National The Book Show, 2007-11-09 Accessed: 2007-11-09
Knox, Malcolm (2003) 'Dual winners in Biography Prize's latest chapter' in The Sydney Morning Herald, 14 March 2003
State Library of New South Wales, National Biography Award Home Page

Biography awards
Australian literary awards
Awards established in 1996